The 2006 Wales Rally GB was the final round of the 2006 World Rally Championship season. It took place between December 1–3, 2006.

Results

Special Stages
All dates and times are GMT (UTC).

External links

 Results at eWRC-results.com
 Results at Jonkka's World Rally Archive

Wales Rally
Rally GB
Wales Rally
Wales Rally GB